Runesocesius was a deity whose name appears on an inscription from the region of Évora, the Roman Ebora in modern Portugal in the area inhabited by the Celtici in Lusitania. He has generally been thought of as a Lusitanian god.

Discovery & interpretation
At the close of the 19th Century, a Roman dedication was discovered and examined by Portuguese archaeologists near Évora. The inscription was in Latin and read SANCTRVNESOCESIOSACRVGLIC ... QVINTCINV ... BALS. In a paper submitted to the French Société des Antiquaires this was interpreted as Sancto Runeso Cesio Sacrum G. Licinius Quinctinus Balsensis: a dedication by Gaius Licinius Quinctinus of Balsa to a previously unknown god, Runesus Cesius. The name was interpreted as Celtic, with "Cesius" an allograph for gaesius and hence deriving from the roots *runa- and *gaiso- meaning "the Mysterious One of the Javelin (or Spear)"

An alternative reading, as a single word Runesocesius, was proposed by J M Blazquez-Martinez in the light of the element -eso- being a recurring one in Lusitanian names.

Significance
Blazquez-Martinez also observed that whereas there were large numbers of deities recorded in the Northern Lusitanian and Gallaecian regions, only the names of Endovelicus, Ataegina and Runesocesius appeared in the South, beyond the Tagus river, which some have supposed must have meant particular importance was attached to these three. The character of the Celtici and other peoples in this region and their affiliation as Lusitanian, Celtic or Tartessian/Turdetanian remain a complex issue.  The name itself and its meaning remain subject to interpretation. C. Licinius Quinctinus' home in Balsa lay further South in what was, while part of the Roman province of Lusitania, outside the area of Lusitanian epigraphy and Lusitanian-Gallaecian theonyms, in the Tartessian or Turdetanian speaking part of the Iberian Peninsula. Runesocesius could therefore be seen as significant to the Lusitanians, Celtiberians or Turdetani, or to all three.

References

Lusitanian gods